Abdul Hai is an Indian cricketer, who played for Hyderabad amongst others in first-class and List A cricket.

He played for both Hyderabad and Uttar Pradesh teams.

References 

Indian cricketers